Ashley Cheeseman Memorial Park is a Canadian urban park and sports field located in the Lakeside neighbourhood of Halifax, Nova Scotia. The park is located next to the Lakeside Recreation Centre. The park was opened by Nancy Cheeseman and The Hon. Garnet Brown, Minister of Recreation.

Features
 Skate Park
 basketball court
 baseball diamond
 playground
 Community Garden

History
The park was named in memory of the late Ashley Cheeseman who died at age 34 at the Victoria General Hospital March 25, 1976. He was born in Halifax the son of Agnes (Downey) and Douglas Cheeseman. He was employed with the Halifax Dockyards for the seven years and served with the Royal Canadian Navy for 13 years.

References 

Parks in Halifax, Nova Scotia